Sathiyan Gnanasekaran (born 8 January 1993) is an Indian table tennis player, who is the highest ranked Indian, currently ranked at 39 in the world as of November 2022.
He was a member of the Indian team that won back to back Gold medals in 2018 & 2022 Commonwealth Games .

In May 2019, Sathiyan attained his career best World ranking of 24 and became the first Indian paddler ever to break into the World Top-25 ITTF rankings.

He became the first Indian paddler to sign a contract with Okayama Rivets for the Japanese T-league. 
He has currently signed up with JURA MOREZ for the French PRO-A league.

He is an employee of ONGC & currently being supported by the GoSports Foundation through the Rahul Dravid Athlete Mentorship Programme.

Achievements 

Sathiyan announced himself in the world stage in Table Tennis when he won the ITTF Challenge Belgium Open title in the men's singles category in September 2016. This was his first ITTF pro tour title. In the final match played at De Haan in Belgium, he defeated the local player Nuytinck Cedric with a 4-0 score in the final - with 15-13, 11-6, 11-2, 17-15. With this victory, he became the first Indian table tennis player to win an ITTF event on European soil.

2017 had been a special year for Sathiyan where he won gold in the ITTF Challenge - Spanish Open, in Almeria (2017) in the men's singles category and created history by becoming the first Indian Table Tennis player ever to win two ITTF pro tour titles.

In April 2018, he won three medals in his debut Commonwealth Games at Gold Coast, Australia.

In August 2018, He also played an important role by winning both his matches against Japan in the Men Team category quarterfinals and won a historic bronze medal at the Asian Games 2018 held at Jakarta for the first time ever after a gap of 60 years.

He was conferred with Arjuna Award in the year 2018.

In September 2019, he pulled off the biggest win of his career by defeating the Japanese prodigy Tomokazu Harimoto in straight sets at the Asian TT Championships 2019. In the same event, he also gave a stellar performance by becoming the first Indian ever after a gap of 43 years to reach the Quarterfinals in Men Singles category.

On November 29, 2019 Sathiyan made his debut World Cup appearance and defeated higher-ranked French player Simon Gauzy 11-13, 9-11, 11-8, 14-12, 7-11, 11-5, 11-8 before beating world number 24 Jonathan Groth of Denmark 11-9, 7-11, 11-5, 11-6, 11-2, to top his group and reach the round of 16 in 2019 ITTF Men's World Cup. The world number 30 G Sathiyan, went down 1-4 (11-7, 8-11, 5-11, 9-11, 8-11) to Timo Boll in the pre-quarters.

In 2021, Sathiyan competed in the 2020 Summer Olympics in Tokyo.

In the 2022 Birmingham Commonwealth Games, Sathiyan again won three medals with Gold in Men Team, Silver in Men Doubles and also a Bronze in Men Singles. G. Sathiyan won bronze in TT Men’s singles.

Awards 
Arjuna Award 2018
TOISA Table Tennis player of the year award 2017 (Jury choice)

References 

Indian male table tennis players
Living people
Racket sportspeople from Chennai
Table tennis players at the 2020 Summer Olympics
Olympic table tennis players of India
Table tennis players at the 2018 Commonwealth Games
Table tennis players at the 2022 Commonwealth Games
Commonwealth Games medallists in table tennis
Commonwealth Games gold medallists for India
Commonwealth Games silver medallists for India
Commonwealth Games bronze medallists for India
Tamil sportspeople
1993 births
Table tennis players at the 2018 Asian Games
Asian Games medalists in table tennis
Asian Games bronze medalists for India
Medalists at the 2018 Asian Games
Recipients of the Arjuna Award
20th-century Indian people
21st-century Indian people
Medallists at the 2018 Commonwealth Games
Medallists at the 2022 Commonwealth Games
South Asian Games gold medalists for India
South Asian Games silver medalists for India
South Asian Games medalists in table tennis